The James V. and Sophia Baker House is a historic home located at 204 Broadway St. in Cottonwood, Idaho. The American Craftsman style house was constructed in 1916. The house's design features tapered columns on its front porch, exposed rafters and open eaves, and fake braces which appear to support the roof's gables. James V. Baker, the home's original owner, was a farmer and wagon driver who migrated to the Northwest from Illinois; he lived in Cottonwood for several years in the early 1900s, briefly left, and commissioned the home after his return in 1915.

The house was added to the National Register of Historic Places on January 6, 2004.

References

Baker
Houses completed in 1916
Houses in Idaho County, Idaho
American Craftsman architecture in Idaho
National Register of Historic Places in Idaho County, Idaho